Le Chesnay is a former commune in the Yvelines department in the Île-de-France region in north-central France. On 1 January 2019, it was merged into the new commune Le Chesnay-Rocquencourt. It is located in the western suburbs of Paris,  from the center of Paris.

History

On 1 July 1815, Napoleon's Grande Armée fought its last battle in Rocquencourt and Le Chesnay.  After the defeat of Waterloo on 18 June 1815, Grouchy's army withdrew to Paris via Namur and Dinant, reaching Paris on 29 June, a few days before the Prussians, who camped at Versailles.

While negotiating the final armistice, Exelmans was ordered to attack the Prussians at Versailles on 1 July 1815. Under attack the Prussians retreated from Versailles and headed east, but were blocked by the French at Vélizy.  They failed to re-enter Versailles and headed for Saint-Germain-en-Laye.  Their first squadron came under fire at the entrance of Rocquencourt and attempted to escape through the fields.  They were forced into a small, narrow street in Le Chesnay and killed or captured.  However, the main body of the Prussian army succeeded in reaching Saint-Germain. (From Presentation of Rocquencourt)

Transport
Le Chesnay is not served by any station of the Paris Métro, RER, or suburban rail network. The closest station to Le Chesnay is Versailles – Rive Droite station on the Transilien Paris – Saint-Lazare suburban rail line. This station is located in the neighboring city of Versailles,  from the town center of Le Chesnay.

LDS Temple
In April 2017, the Church of Jesus Christ of Latter-day Saints opened its first temple in Metropolitan France to the public prior to its dedication on May 21, 2017. The Paris France Temple is located in Le Chesnay near the outer gardens of the Château de Versailles. The Pape'ete Tahiti Temple was built earlier and is in Overseas France, in Pape'ete, Tahiti.

Notable residents
Laura Georges, footballer
Nicolas Godin (1969), member of music group Air
Cyrille Eldin (1973), journalist
Thomas Lombard (1975), rugby union player
Nicolas Anelka (1979), "Le Sulk", footballer
Tristan Gommendy (1979), racing driver
Kevin Staut (1980), equestrian
Sébastien Rouault (1986), swimmer
Victor Wembanyama, basketball player

Hospital
 André Mignot Hospital

Education 
Public preschools:
 Maryse Bastié
 Hélène Boucher
 Jean-Louis Forain
 Jean de La Fontaine
 Mozart
 Charles Perrault

Public elementary schools: 
 Guynemer
Langevin
Le Nôtre
 Molière

Public secondary schools:
 Collège Charles Péguy - Junior high school
 Lycée Jean Moulin - Senior high school/sixth form college
The commune is also served by senior high schools/sixth form colleges in Versailles: , Lycée Hoche, Lycée Marie-Curie, Lycée Jules-Ferry, and Lycée Jacques-Prévert.

There is one private school, Blanche de Castille, with a preschool and elementary school campus, and a junior high school and senior high school campus.

Universities:
 Versailles Saint-Quentin-en-Yvelines University

There is also a municipal library, la Bibliothèque du Chesnay.

See also
Communes of the Yvelines department

References

External links

Official website (in French)

Former communes of Yvelines
Populated places disestablished in 2019